Brett "The Birdman" Evans (born 26 May 1972) is a former Australian rules footballer who played with Richmond in the Australian Football League (AFL).

Evans, a forward, played for Narre Warren and Springvale, before being picked up by Melbourne in the 1993 Mid-Season Draft. He was a member of Melbourne's 1993 reserves premiership team but didn't play a senior league game and ended up returning to Springvale.

Richmond offered him a second chance when they secured him at pick six in the 1997 Pre-Season Draft. He made 28 appearances for Richmond over four seasons, all but four of them in 1998 and 1999.
 
He finished his career back at Narre Warren, where he played in five Mornington Peninsula premierships.

References

1972 births
Living people
Australian rules footballers from Victoria (Australia)
Richmond Football Club players
Casey Demons players